De Sola Pool is a surname. Notable people with the surname include:

 David de Sola Pool (1885–1970), spiritual leader of the Sephardic Congregation Shearith Israel in New York City, father of Ithiel
 Ithiel de Sola Pool (1917–1984), pioneer in the development of social science